Clarks Knob is a summit in Franklin County, Pennsylvania.  It is the highest point on Blue Mountain, the eastern front range of Pennsylvania's Ridge and Valley Appalachians region.

Geography

Clarks Knob's northeast-southwest running summit ridge forms the boundary of the Susquehanna River and Potomac River drainages. This mountain is protected within the Buchanan State Forest.

References

Mountains of Pennsylvania
Landforms of Franklin County, Pennsylvania